Dobrolyot, or sometimes Dobrolet, was an early Soviet airline, with the name drawn from part of its full name (Добровольного or Dobrovol'nogo).  The Russian Society of Voluntary Air Fleet (Российское общество Добровольного воздушного флота, transliterated as Rossiyskoye obshchestvo Dobrovol'nogo vozdushnogo flota) was formed in 1923 and existed throughout the remainder of the 1920s. It was formed in imitation of the Russian Merchant Navy Volunteer Fleet (Dobroflot), which had previously been formed back in 1878.

History 
The Dobrolyot society was created in the Russian Soviet Federative Socialist Republic on March 17, 1923 to contribute to the development of the country's air fleet. A capital of two million gold rubles was authorised to fund its early projects and this was later augmented by funds derived from the issuance of stocks, which were initially offered to Soviet enterprises at the cost of one gold ruble a piece. Those who bought 25,000 shares were given the right to use a plane from its fleet. When a line between Moscow and Nijni-Novgorod was established, a daily service was arranged using nineteen Junker-type aeroplanes. 

The basic objectives were the organisation of airmail, cargo and passenger lines, aviation related solutions of national economic problems (for example, aerial photography of localities) and also the development of the domestic aircraft industry. For example, Dobrolyot constructed airports and weather stations. Territorially, activity of this organisation covered Russia and Central Asia.

In 1929, Dobrolyot and the similar organisations of other Soviet republics Ukrpovitroshliach (Ukrainian Airways) and Zakavia (a Georgian Airline) were incorporated into Dobrolyot USSR.

On October 29, 1930, Dobrolyot was abolished, forming the basis for the Central administration of the Civil air fleet (GU GVF), later becoming Aeroflot. Up until that time, the society's flight routes totaled 26,000 km in length; 47,000 passengers and 408 tonnes of cargo had been transported.

In 1932, all civil aviation activities were consolidated under the name of Grazhdansky Vozdushny Flot (Civil Air Fleet), known as Aeroflot.

In 1993, in Russia, the Dobrolyot Aviation Company JSC was created. It was operating cargo flights.

See also 

 Dobroflot

References

Further reading 
 

Transport in the Soviet Union
Former Aeroflot divisions
Airlines of the Soviet Union
Airlines established in 1923
1923 establishments in the Soviet Union